In organic chemistry, an imide is a functional group consisting of two acyl groups bound to nitrogen. The compounds are structurally related to acid anhydrides, although imides are more resistant to hydrolysis. In terms of commercial applications, imides are best known as components of high-strength polymers, called polyimides. Inorganic imides are also known as solid state or gaseous compounds, and the imido group (=NH) can also act as a ligand.

Nomenclature
Most imides are cyclic compounds derived from dicarboxylic acids, and their names reflect the parent acid. Examples are succinimide, derived from succinic acid, and phthalimide, derived from phthalic acid. For imides derived from amines (as opposed to ammonia), the N-substituent is indicated by a prefix. For example, N-ethylsuccinimide is derived from succinic acid and ethylamine. Isoimides are isomeric with normal imides and have the formula RC(O)OC(NR′)R″. They are often intermediates that convert to the more symmetrical imides. Organic compounds called carbodiimides have the formula RN=C=NR. They are unrelated to imides.

Imides from dicarboxylic acids
The PubChem links gives access to more information on the compounds, including other names, ids, toxicity and safety.
{| class="wikitable"
|+
!n!!Common name!!Systematic name!!Structure!!PubChem!!parent acid!!structure
|-
|2||Succinimide||Pyrrolidine-2,5-dione||||11439||Succinic acid||
|-
|2, unsaturated, cis carbon-carbon double bonds||Maleimide||Pyrrole-2,5-dione|| ||10935||Maleic acid||
|-
|3||Glutarimide||Piperidine-2,6-dione||||70726||Glutaric acid||
|-
|6||Phthalimide||Isoindole-1,3-dione||||6809||Phthalic acid||
|}

Properties
Being highly polar, imides exhibit good solubility in polar media. The N–H center for imides derived from ammonia is acidic and can participate in hydrogen bonding. Unlike the structurally related acid anhydrides, they resist hydrolysis and some can even be recrystallized from boiling water.

Occurrence and applications
Many high strength or electrically conductive polymers contain imide subunits, i.e., the polyimides. One example is Kapton where the repeat unit consists of two imide groups derived from aromatic tetracarboxylic acids. Another example of polyimides is the polyglutarimide typically made from polymethylmethacrylate (PMMA) and ammonia or a primary amine by aminolysis and cyclization of the PMMA at high temperature and pressure, typically in an extruder. This technique is called reactive extrusion. A commercial polyglutarimide product based on the methylamine derivative of PMMA, called Kamax, was produced by the Rohm and Haas company. The toughness of these materials reflects the rigidity of the imide functional group.

Interest in the bioactivity of imide-containing compounds was sparked by the early discovery of the high bioactivity of the Cycloheximide as an inhibitor of protein biosynthesis in certain organisms. Thalidomide, famous for its adverse effects, is one result of this research. A number of fungicides and herbicides contain the imide functionality. Examples include Captan, which is considered carcinogenic under some conditions, and Procymidone.

In the 21st century new interest arose in thalidomide's immunomodulatory effects, leading to the class of immunomodulators known as immunomodulatory imide drugs (IMiDs).

Preparation
Most common imides are prepared by heating dicarboxylic acids or their anhydrides and ammonia or primary amines. The result is a condensation reaction:
 (RCO)2O + R′NH2  →  (RCO)2NR′ + H2O
These reactions proceed via the intermediacy of amides. The intramolecular reaction of a carboxylic acid with an amide is far faster than the intermolecular reaction, which is rarely observed.

They may also be produced via the oxidation of amides, particularly when starting from lactams.
 R(CO)NHCH2R'  + 2 [O] →  R(CO)N(CO)R'  +  H2O

Certain imides can also be prepared in the isoimide-to-imide Mumm rearrangement.

Reactions
For imides derived from ammonia, the N–H center is weakly acidic. Thus, alkali metal salts of imides can be prepared by conventional bases such as potassium hydroxide. The conjugate base of phthalimide is potassium phthalimide. These anion can be alkylated to give N-alkylimides, which in turn can be degraded to release the primary amine. Strong nucleophiles, such as potassium hydroxide or hydrazine are used in the release step.

Treatment of imides with halogens and base gives the N-halo derivatives. Examples that are useful in organic synthesis are N-chlorosuccinimide and N-bromosuccinimide, which respectively serve as sources of "Cl+" and "Br+" in organic synthesis.

Imides in coordination chemistry
In coordination chemistry transition metal imido complexes feature the NR2- ligand. They are similar to oxo ligands in some respects.  In some the M-N-C angle is 180º but often the angle is decidedly bent.  The parent imide (NH2-) is an intermediate in nitrogen fixation by synthetic catalysts.

References

External links 
 IUPAC: imides

See also 
 Inorganic imide

 
Functional groups